The Palestine sunbird (Cinnyris osea) is a small passerine bird of the sunbird family, Nectariniidae. Found in parts of the Middle East and sub-Saharan Africa, it is also known as the orange-tufted sunbird, a name also used for the similar Cinnyris bouvieri, found further south in Africa. In 2015, the Palestinian Authority adopted the species as a national bird. The specific name osea is derived from Ancient Greek ὁσια (hosia, "holy").

Description
The Palestine sunbird is 8 to 12 cm long with a wingspan of 14 to 16 cm. Males have an average weight of 7.6 g and females weigh around 6.8 g. The bill is fairly long, black and curves downwards. The plumage of breeding males is mostly dark but appears glossy blue or green in the light. There are orange tufts at the sides of the breast which are hard to see except at close range. Females and juveniles are grey-brown above with pale underparts. Non-breeding males are similar but may retain some dark feathers.

It has a high, fast, jingling song and various calls including a harsh alarm call.

Habitat and range
It occurs in areas with high temperatures and dry climate from sea level up to an altitude of 3200 m. It inhabits dry woodland, scrub, wadis, savannas, orchards and gardens. It is common in towns in some areas, and is a familiar sight in Tel Aviv.

The Middle Eastern subspecies C. o. osea breeds from Israel, the Palestinian territories and Jordan in the north, down through western Saudi Arabia to Yemen and Oman in the south. In recent decades it has colonized the Sinai Peninsula in Egypt. It has been observed breeding in Lebanon and regularly winters in both Lebanon and Syria. The African subspecies C. o. decorsei is found very locally in parts of Sudan, north-west Uganda, the Central African Republic, north-east Democratic Republic of Congo and northern Cameroon.

Feeding
The diet consists mainly of insects and nectar. The tongue is long and brush-tipped to extract nectar from flowers.

Reproduction
The purse-like nest hangs from a branch in a tree or bush. It is 18 cm long and 8 cm wide at the base. It is made of leaves, grass and other plant material which is bound together with hair and spider webs and lined with wool and feathers. One to three smooth, glossy eggs are laid. These are somewhat variable in colour; often white or grey with faint markings at the broader end. They are incubated for 13 to 14 days. The young are downy with an orange-red mouth and fledge after 14 to 21 days.

Gallery

References

Citations

General and cited references 
 Harrison, Colin (1975). A Field Guide to the Nests, Eggs and Nestlings of British and European Birds, Collins, London.
 Hollom, P. A. D., Porter, R. F., Christensen, S. & Willis, Ian (1988). Birds of the Middle East and North Africa, T & AD Poyser, Calton, England.
 Sinclair, Ian & Ryan, Peter (2003). Birds of Africa South of the Sahara, Struik, Cape Town.
 Snow, D. W. & Perrins, C. M. (1998). Birds of the Western Palearctic: Concise Edition, Vol. 2, Oxford University Press, Oxford.

External links 
 

Palestine sunbird
Birds of Sub-Saharan Africa
Birds of the Middle East
Palestine sunbird
Fauna of Israel
National symbols of the Palestinian National Authority
National symbols of the State of Palestine
Palestine sunbird